The 1940 Louisville Cardinals football team was an American football team that represented the University of Louisville as a member of the Southern Intercollegiate Athletic Association (SIAA) during the 1940 college football season. In their fifth season under head coach Laurie Apitz, the Cardinals compiled a 3–5–1 record.

Schedule

References

Louisville
Louisville Cardinals football seasons
Louisville Cardinals football